Adrian Cristian Marian Șter (born 19 April 1998) is a Romanian professional footballer who plays as a forward for Liga III side SCM Zalău. In his career, Șter also played for teams such as Minaur Baia Mare, Comuna Recea, CFR II Cluj or FC U Craiova 1948.

References

External links
 

1998 births
Living people
Sportspeople from Baia Mare
Romanian footballers
Association football forwards
Liga I players
Liga II players
Liga III players
CS Minaur Baia Mare (football) players
CS Academica Recea players
FC U Craiova 1948 players
FC Hermannstadt players
CSM Ceahlăul Piatra Neamț players